Luke Bruno Milanzi (born 4 December 1994), variously known as Luka Milanzi or Bruno Milanzi, is a former Malawian footballer.

Club career
Milanzi joined Congolese side TP Mazembe in 2010 from ESCOM United in suspicious circumstances, with FIFA having to intervene after Milanzi had signed a 3 and a half year deal, despite international rules stating players under 18 could only sign 3 year deals. The two sides' documentation reportedly did not match either, with rumours of Milanzi lying about his age, a common occurrence in African football. Because of this, when he called up to the Malawi national team in 2010, Milanzi had to travel through Zambia before entering Malawi, and often has trouble journeying between countries due to his questionable documents.

In January 2012, TP Mazembe loaned Milanzi to its affiliate CS Don Bosco. Milanzi remained under contract with TP Mazembe. However, he did not break into the first team, and would be loaned to NAPSA Stars and ZESCO United. In 2014, Milanzi was cleared to play for the Mighty Wanderers of his hometown, Blantyre, after initially not being able to sign due to preconditions on his loan release. He impressed during his time with The Nomads, who then extended his loan deal in 2015.

He signed on loan for the Big Bullets in 2016 from TP Mazembe.

He joined Masters Security in April 2017 in a loan deal from Big Bullets. However, due to an issue with wage payment, he left in late 2017 to join Blue Eagles. He played for the Eagles for a few months before being released.

Shortly after his release from the Eagles, Milanzi retired prematurely from football, citing an injury sustained during his time with TP Mazembe.

International career
Milanzi played for the Malawi under 17's at the 2009 African U-17 Championship, despite supposedly only being 14 at the time. He also played at the 2009 FIFA U-17 World Cup where he made three appearances and scored a consolation goal in a 4-1 loss to Spain.

He made his one and only senior appearance in 2010, a second-half substitute in a friendly against Zimbabwe.

He was called up to the squad again in 2015 while playing for the Mighty Wanderers.

Coaching career
In 2020, Milanzi went into coaching, attending a course to obtain a Local D license and coaching at local Mzuzu club Bright Stars. He later went on to coach Rumphi United in the Super League of Malawi.

Career statistics

International

References

1994 births
Living people
People from Blantyre
Malawian footballers
Malawi international footballers
Malawian expatriate footballers
Association football forwards
Eagle Strikers FC players
TP Mazembe players
NAPSA Stars F.C. players
ZESCO United F.C. players
Masters Security FC players
Blue Eagles FC players
Malawian expatriate sportspeople in Zambia
Expatriate footballers in Zambia
Malawian expatriate sportspeople in the Democratic Republic of the Congo
Expatriate footballers in the Democratic Republic of the Congo
Malawi youth international footballers